Geoffrey Muller (1917–1994) was a British film editor. He worked a number of times with film director Ken Hughes.

Selected filmography
 Mystery Junction (1951)
 The Floating Dutchman (1952)
 Wide Boy (1952)
 Counterspy (1953)
 Dangerous Voyage (1954)
 The Brain Machine (1955)
 Little Red Monkey (1955)
 Confession (1955)
 The Long Knife (1958)
 Horrors of the Black Museum (1959)
 Urge to Kill (1960)

References

External links
 

1917 births
1994 deaths
British film editors